The Waiting Room is an Australian observational documentary series that began airing on the Nine Network on 4 December 2008.

Nine Network original programming
2008 Australian television series debuts
2008 Australian television series endings